govWorks Inc. was a dot-com company that was founded in 1998 by Kaleil Isaza Tuzman, Tom Herman and Chieh Cheung. It went bankrupt when the dot-com bubble burst in 2000. govWorks's rise and fall is documented in the 2001 documentary Startup.com. The firm, originally known as Public Data Systems, produced software to help government clients track contracts and purchasing functions. As the Internet boom accelerated, the company transitioned toward becoming an Internet web portal.

During the company's existence, cities such as Grand Island, New York, showed interest in using its services. A survey was also conducted by The Economist which concluded that people preferred to pay fees owed to the government over the Internet due to its convenience. Still, govWorks’ couldn't overcome some of the most common challenges faced by start-up companies and is ranked by CNET as one of the top ten dot-com failures of the time.

The govWorks website was relaunched in January 2018. The current iteration of govWorks is related to its predecessor in name only. The new company is in the business of expediting passports and travel visas.

History 

The company was founded in May 1998 with 8 employees and was originally known as Public Data Systems.  The service delivery model for govWorks, which was inspired by Tuzman after he found a two-year-old parking ticket in his New York City apartment, was to offer a service that provided the ability for people to pay city fees through their Internet portal.  The initial launch of govWorks.com online services to select markets occurred in October 1999 in key cities in Massachusetts and Connecticut with a full scale rollout planned in early 2000.

The firm set out to provide a website portal to allow citizens in local communities to access, pay or apply for city services, jobs or receive community information. Unlike many other dot-com companies of the time, the services provided by govWorks.com appeared to have a well-defined business plan, a market in need of a service and offered access to city services with ease through their website portal.  However, like so many others, govWorks’ mismanagement, demand for capital, speed to market and a lack of proper service execution eventually contributed to the failure of the company.  In January 2001, Tuzman and his investors sold the company to First Data Corporation.

According to public statements by govWorks.com co-founder Tom Herman, the sale resulted in a loss for the founders and investors.  The company had burned through approximately $60 million in venture capital during its three years of existence.

Just a few months after the founding of govWorks.com, interest in the company was strong and govWorks.com employee count grew to 30 employees as of August 1998 and by October 1998, the company had 70 employees. The Startup.com movie showcased a business culture with energy and excitement; people were interested in joining the company with the hope of getting in at the beginning stages of another dot-com success story.  As additional capital investment came into the company and as the company neared its full scale rollout in 2000, the company expanded further with headcount from 120 employees in January 2000 to over 250 employees in April 2000.  However, as depicted in the movie, govWorks.com suffered from a number of organizational power struggles and governance issues that would eventually lead to the company's demise.

Towards the end of 2000, when it was clear that the company was hemorrhaging money and not able to fully execute its planned services, the company dramatically reduced its headcount to 60 employees in November 2000 in an attempt to stem the $1 million per month in overhead expenditures.  The company was sold to First Data Corporation in January 2001.
The documentary film, Startup.com which was released by Artisan in May 2001, won the Grand Prize at the 2001 Sundance Film Festival and accumulated $765,000 in initial box office receipts.

Affiliated companies 

Collectively, corporate governance of govworks.com was associated with thirty one (31) for-profit and not-for-profit companies and institutions from a variety of market sectors, including:

Chase Manhattan, Hyatt Legal Services, Stanford University, Jackson Securities, Kohlberg Kravis Roberts, New York City Investment Fund, Mayfield Fund, Corradini & Company, The Duberstein Group, Barnes & Thornburg, Sapient Corporation, Vestar Capital Partners, Urban Health Initiative, Harvard University, JumpStart, The ASHOKA Foundation, Public Allies, Kirshenbaum Bond Partners, MassHysteria.com, Chrysler Corporation, Into Networks, Endeavor Fund, Sportsline.com, Vignette, Premier Asset Management, Star Media Networks, Patagon.com, COTESA, S.A. de C.V., Chrysalis Capital, First International Resources Inc., ISI Emerging Markets.

Competitors 
One of govWorks's main competitors was Atlanta-based EzGov.com, which offered software to local governments and municipalities to allow citizens to pay parking tickets, taxes and obtain other city services on-line 24 hours a day. EzGov co-founder Bryan Mundy was invited by Tuzman to tour govWorks offices prior to either company releasing their software; this visit was shown in Startup.com. In January 2001, Mundy and Erin Johansen, 26, of Ontario, Canada died of smoke inhalation during a fire in Mundy's Atlanta, GA home.

In addition to EzGov, govWorks had other competitors, some of whom offered the same or similar service as govWorks but at a much lower cost or even free, as the competitor service models relied on alternate forms of financing versus govWorks’ client-funded approach.

Bankruptcy filing 
In March 2001, govWorks.com officially filed for Chapter 11 bankruptcy protection. At the time of the filing, the company listed assets worth an approximate $8 million and liabilities of $40 million from the more than $70 million it raised through venture capital. Boalt Holdings, LLC acquired the domain and brand assets in 2017.

Current ownership 
The govWorks website was relaunched under new ownership in January 2018  and has developed a software platform which allows companies to offer passport application creation services to US Passport holders.

References

Online companies of the United States
Internet properties established in 1998
Internet properties disestablished in 2000
Dot-com bubble